María Teresa Jiménez Esquivel (born 25 May 1984) is a Mexican politician affiliated with the National Action Party (PAN). She served as mayor of Aguascalientes City as well as deputy of the LXII Legislature of the Mexican Congress representing Aguascalientes. She is the current Governor of Aguascalientes, becoming the first woman to govern the state.

References

1984 births
Living people
Politicians from the State of Mexico
Women members of the Chamber of Deputies (Mexico)
Members of the Chamber of Deputies (Mexico)
National Action Party (Mexico) politicians
21st-century Mexican politicians
21st-century Mexican women politicians
Autonomous University of Aguascalientes alumni
Municipal presidents of Aguascalientes
Governors of Aguascalientes